The 2009–10 Hawaii Rainbow Warriors basketball team represented the University of Hawaii during the 2009–10 men's college basketball season. This was Bob Nash's third and final season as head coach as he was fired at the end of the season. The Warriors played their home games at the Stan Sheriff Center and competed in the Western Athletic Conference. The Rainbow Warriors finished the season 10–20 and 3–13 in WAC play to finish ninth and failed to qualify for the 2010 WAC men's basketball tournament.

Pre-season
In the WAC preseason polls, released October 20 via media teleconference Hawai'i was selected to finish 9th in the coaches and media polls. Sr. Roderick Flemings was selected to the coaches All-WAC second team.

2009–10 Team

Roster
Source

Coaching staff

2009–10 schedule and results
Source
All times are Hawaiian

|-
!colspan=9| Exhibition

|-
!colspan=9| Regular Season

References

Hawai'i
Hawaii Rainbow Warriors basketball seasons
Rainbow
Rainbow